Isange is an administrative ward in the Busokelo District of the Mbeya Region of Tanzania. In 2016 the Tanzania National Bureau of Statistics report there were 6,381 people in the ward, from 5,790 in 2012.

Villages / vitongoji 
The ward has 4 villages and 22 vitongoji.

 Bumbigi
 Iloba
 Kititu
 Lwangilo A
 Lwangilo B
 Nguka
 Nsanga
 Isange
 Iponjola
 Ipyela
 Isabula
 Isanu
 Lugombo
 Mpunga
 Ndamba
 Sota
 Matamba
 Ibungu
 Ilondo
 Lumbila
 Matamba Chini
 Matamba Juu
 Nkalisi
 Ipyana
 Kikuba
 Nkalisi

References

Wards of Mbeya Region